The men's 100 meter team running deer, single shots was a shooting sports event held as part of the shooting at the 1912 Summer Olympics programme. It was the second appearance of the event, which had been introduced in 1908. The competition was held on Thursday, 4 July 1912.

Twenty sport shooters from five nations competed.

Oscar Swahn was 64 years and 258 days old when he won gold as part of the Swedish team. This remains the record for the oldest person to win Olympic gold.

Results

References

External links
 
 

Shooting at the 1912 Summer Olympics
100 meter running deer at the Olympics